Nankang may refer to:

Mainland China 
 Nankang District, Ganzhou, Jiangxi
 Nankang District (南康镇), in Lushan City, Jiangxi
 Nankang (南康镇), town in Tieshangang District, Beihai, Guangxi

Taiwan 
 Nankang Rubber Tire (南港輪胎股份有限公司), tire manufacturer based in Taipei
 Nangang District, Taipei (南港區)